Nelson Keys (7 April 1886 in London, England – 26 April 1939 in London) was a British stage and film actor, a star in musical comedy and stage revue, including the 1924 Ziegfeld Follies.

He was the father of film producer Anthony Nelson Keys and director John Paddy Carstairs, who wrote his biography, Bunch in 1941.

Filmography

References

External links

1886 births
1939 deaths
English male stage actors
English male film actors
English male silent film actors
Male actors from London
20th-century English male actors